Abdul Rahim Khan Ziaratwal (borne 4 May 1954) is a Pakistani politician hailing from Ziarat, Ziarat District, Balochistan, Pakistan belong to Pashtunkhwa Milli Awami Party. He is currently serving as Minister of Education in the Provincial Assembly of Balochistan. He is also serving as committee member of Finance Committee and Public Accounts Committee.

Education and political career 
Abdul Rahim Ziaratwal belong to Tareen tribe. He achieved the degree of BA, Msc in Statistics and LLB from University of Balochistan.He elected ed as Member of the Provincial Assembly of Balochistan from 2000 to 2007 in General Elections 2002. He is also served as the Chairman of Legislative Development Steering Committee of USAID PLSP. He is also served as board member of Pashtoonkhwa Blood Bank. He is also served as Minister of Information in the Provincial Assembly of Balochistan.

References

External links
 

1954 births
Living people
People from Sibi District
Pashtunkhwa Milli Awami Party politicians
Balochistan MPAs 2002–2007
Balochistan MPAs 2013–2018
Leaders of the Opposition in the Provincial Assembly of Balochistan